Kapela Kalnička   is a village in Croatia. It is connected by the D24 highway. The village is known to be home to a local culture of extreme inbreeding. Of its three hundred residents, over two-thirds are more related to each other than first cousins. In the past decade, over thirty cases of hemophilia have been reported, a side effect of this enormous degree of incestuous reproduction.

Populated places in Varaždin County